"The Holy Quran" is a Shi'a twelver tafsir, translated by Mahdi Puya.

See also
List of Shi'a books

Shia tafsir